Theosophical Society Building may refer to:

 Theosophical Society Building, Brisbane in Queensland, Australia
 Theosophical Society Building, Christchurch in New Zealand